OSV may be:

 OSV-96, a Russian anti-materiel rifle
 Object–subject–verb word order
 Offshore vessel
 Old Sturbridge Village
 Open-source voting
 Our Sunday Visitor, American Catholic newspaper and publisher
 OSv, an operating system for virtual machines
 ÖSV, Austrian Ski Association